Hordaland District Court is a district court located in Vestland county, Norway. This court is based at two different courthouses which are located in Bergen and Lofthus. The court serves the Nordhordland, Midthordland, and Hardanger areas of the county which includes cases from 18 municipalities. The court in Bergen accepts cases from the municipalities of Alver, Askøy, Austevoll, Austrheim, Bergen, Bjørnafjorden, Fedje, Masfjorden, Modalen, Osterøy, Samnanger, Vaksdal, Voss, and Øygarden. The court in Lofthus (which also can meet in Norheimsund and Odda) accepts cases from the municipalities of Eidfjord, Kvam, Ullensvang, and Ulvik. The court is subordinate to the Gulating Court of Appeal.

The court is led by a chief judge and several other judges. The court is a court of first instance. Its judicial duties are mainly to settle criminal cases and to resolve civil litigation as well as bankruptcy. The administration and registration tasks of the court include death registration, issuing certain certificates, performing duties of a notary public, and officiating civil wedding ceremonies. Cases from this court are heard by a combination of professional judges and lay judges.

History
This court was established on 26 April 2021 after the old Bergen District Court and Hardanger District Court were merged into one court. The new district court system continues to use the courthouses from the predecessor courts.

References

District courts of Norway
2021 establishments in Norway
Organisations based in Bergen
Organisations based in Lofthus, Hordaland